The Berkeley Institute for Data Science (BIDS) is a central hub of research and education within University of California, Berkeley designed to facilitate data-intensive science and earn grants to be disseminated within the sciences. BIDS was initially funded by grants from the Gordon and Betty Moore Foundation and the Sloan Foundation as part of a three-year grant with data science institutes at New York University and the University of Washington.  The objective of the three-university initiative is to bring together domain experts from the natural and social sciences, along with methodological experts from computer science, statistics, and applied mathematics. The organization has an executive director and a faculty director, Saul Perlmutter, who won the 2011 Nobel Prize in Physics. The initiative was announced at a White House Office of Science and Technology Policy event to highlight and promote advances in data-driven scientific discovery, and is a core component of the National Science Foundation's strategic plan for building national capacity in data science.

Working groups 

There are six working groups that are common across the three universities included in the original Moore/Sloan grant. The working groups are intended to "address the major challenges facing advances in data-intensive research" and include Career Paths and Alternative Metrics, Reproducibility and Open Science, Education and Training, Ethnography and Evaluation, Software Tools and Environments, and Working Spaces and Culture. and while all three are separate aspects of one division, they were awarded different grant money.

Notable fellows 

A primary objective of BIDS is to build a community of data science fellows and senior fellows across academic disciplines. The 23 current fellows constitute the majority of the onsite liveware at the Institute, which supports a number of notable initiatives (via Fellow support).  The following list is a subset of notable fellows to date:
 Nick Adams, fellow, principal investigator of the Deciding Force project
 Fernando Pérez, senior fellow, creator of Jupyter and IPython
 Dan Hammer, fellow, Presidential Innovation Fellow and former Chief Data Scientist at the World Resources Institute
 Kathryn Huff, fellow, author of Effective Computation in Physics
 Leonard Apeltsin, Health Innovation Fellow, Head of Data Science at Anomaly, co-founder of Primer.ai and author of Data Science Bookcamp: Five Python Projects
 Stéfan Van Der Walt, computational fellow, author of scikit-image
 Laura Waller

References

External links
Official website

University of California, Berkeley
2013 establishments in California